Luiz Filipe da Rosa Machado (born 20 January 1996), commonly known as Filipe Machado or simply Machado, is a Brazilian professional footballer who plays as a defensive midfielder and centre midfielder for Cruzeiro.

Club career
Born in Santa Maria, Brazil, Machado joined the Grêmio's Academy at the age of 19 in 2015. He made his league debut on 28 May 2017 against Sport Recife, starting as a defensive midfielder in a 4–3 away loss, playing full 90 minutes.

Career statistics

Club

Honours
Grêmio
Copa do Brasil: 2016
Copa CONMEBOL Libertadores: 2017
CONMEBOL Recopa Sudamericana: 2018

References

External links

1996 births
Living people
Association football midfielders
Brazilian footballers
Campeonato Brasileiro Série A players
Campeonato Brasileiro Série B players
Campeonato Brasileiro Série C players
Grêmio Foot-Ball Porto Alegrense players
Boa Esporte Clube players
Esporte Clube São José players
Cruzeiro Esporte Clube players